
Gmina Budry is a rural gmina (administrative district) in Węgorzewo County, Warmian-Masurian Voivodeship, in northern Poland, on the border with Russia.

Villages
Gmina Budry contains the villages and settlements of Bogumiły, Brzozówko, Budry, Budzewo, Dąbrówka, Dowiaty, Droglewo, Góry, Grądy Węgorzewskie, Koźlak, Maryszki, Mniszki, Ołownik, Ołownik PGR, Olszewo Węgorzewskie, Pawłowo, Pietrele, Piłaki Małe, Piotrówko, Pochwałki, Popioły, Sąkieły Małe, Skalisko, Skalisze, Sobiechy, Wężówko, Więcki, Wola, Wydutki, Zabrost and Zabrost Wielki.

Neighbouring gminas
Gmina Budry is bordered by the gminas of Banie Mazurskie, Pozezdrze and Węgorzewo. It also borders Russia (Kaliningrad oblast).

References
Polish official population figures 2006

Budry
Węgorzewo County